The Hillberg EH1-01 RotorMouse is an American helicopter that was designed by Donald Gene Hillberg and produced by Hillberg Helicopters of Fountain Valley, California, first flying in 1993. Now out of production, when it was available the aircraft was supplied as a kit for amateur construction.

Design and development
The EH1-01 RotorMouse was designed to comply with the US Experimental - Amateur-built aircraft rules. It features a single main rotor, a two-bladed tail rotor, a single-seat enclosed cockpit with a windshield, skid-type landing gear.

The aircraft's semi-monocoque fuselage is made from 2024-T3 aluminum sheet. Its  diameter two-bladed rotor employs a NACA 0012 airfoil.

Operational history
By 1998 the company reported that one aircraft was completed and flying.

By March 2015 one example had been registered in the United States with the Federal Aviation Administration. The sole one on the registry was in the name of the designer.

Variants
EH1-01 RotorMouse
Single seat version, one completed
EH1-02 TandemMouse
Proposed two seats-in-tandem version to resemble the Bell AH-1 HueyCobra.

Specifications (EH1-01 RotorMouse)

See also
List of rotorcraft

References

External links
Photo of the prototype Hillberg EH1-01 RotorMouse
Photo of the prototype Hillberg EH1-01 RotorMouse

EH1-01 RotorMouse
1990s United States sport aircraft
1990s United States helicopters
Homebuilt aircraft
Helicopters
Single-turbine helicopters
Aircraft first flown in 1993